The 1957 Andreanof Islands earthquake occurred at 04:22 local time on March 9 with a moment magnitude of 8.6 and maximum Modified Mercalli intensity of VIII (Severe). It occurred south of the Andreanof Islands group, which is part of the Aleutian Islands arc. The event occurred along the Aleutian Trench, the convergent plate boundary that separates the Pacific Plate and the North American plates near Alaska. A basin-wide tsunami followed, with effects felt in Alaska and Hawaii, and strong waves recorded across the Pacific rim. Total losses were around $5 million.

Tectonic setting

The Aleutians Islands lie between Kamchatka and mainland Alaska. This oceanic trench runs from the Kuril-Kamchatka Trench in the west to the Yakutat Collision Zone in the east. Most of the trench ruptured in a sequence of earthquakes from east to west. Earthquakes in 1938, 1946, 1948, and 1965 generally progressed westward with smaller earthquakes filling in any gaps. At each terminus of the subduction zone, convergence ends in favor of right-lateral transform faults. In the west, convergence becomes increasingly oblique until the Commander Islands where faulting is nearly completely strike-slip—a 2017 earthquake was associated with this tectonic setting. The plate boundary ends at the Kuril-Kamchatka Trench. In the east, the Pacific Plate continues to subduct underneath the North American plate until the Yakutat microplate. There, a transition from subduction to strike-slip faulting exists. When this transition ends, faulting is completely right-lateral transform and is largely accommodated along the Queen Charlotte Fault.

Earthquake
The seismic intensity peaked at VIII (Severe) on the Modified Mercalli intensity scale at Adak and Umnak. As the shock occurred before the World Wide Standardised Seismological Network was in operation, few instruments recorded the event, and its mechanism is not understood well as a result. Some effort was made with the limited data to gain an understanding of the rupture area and the distribution of slip. One aspect of the event that was certain was that the  aftershock zone was the largest that had ever been observed. The aftershock zone may slightly overlap other ruptures, however there is minimal overlap between the aftershocks of the 1946 Aleutian Islands earthquake to the east and the 1965 Rat Islands earthquake to the west. Studies of the event differ on rupture characteristics. Other studies have the rupture area at a significantly longer . The western portion of the rupture stopped at Bowers Ridge. Studies also disagree on whether the easternmost area near Unalaska ruptured. Some of the early scientific papers conclude that this area remained unruptured during the event and remains a seismic gap. Others, especially ones written decades after the fact, conclude that slip did occur here, but signals from it were blocked by the coda of the main slip. However, the amount of slip is not agreed upon. The tsunami created by the earthquake suggests a  event.

Tsunami

Tsunami waves were reported in far way places such as in Chile. The tsunami's strength led to suspision that a landslide may have contributed to its severity, but there is no evidence of a landslide. A submarine landslide is considered inconsistent with the wave patterns recorded, and the high wave heights could be explained by large amounts of near trench slip.

Alaska
Wave heights were the highest in Alaska. At Sand Bay, the tsunami reached .

Hawaii
On the island of Kauai, the wave height reached  at Haena. In northern Oahu, wave heights reached .

California

Elsewhere
At Fagasā, American Samoa, tsunami run-up heights reached . Many countries in Central America also recorded tsunami run-ups including  at Puntarenas, Costa Rica,  at Puerto San José, Guatemala, and  waves at La Unión, El Salvador. Peru and Chile were favorably oriented for large waves from the tsunami, and as a result strong waves were recorded.

Damage
Prompt warnings from the Seismic Sea Wave Warning System were credited with preventing major damage or loss of life. The earthquake caused severe damage to roads and buildings on Adak including a crack  in size, however there were no deaths. Two bridges and some oil and fuel-related structures at a dock were also destroyed there. On Umnak, a concrete mixer and some docks were lost. At Chernofski, Trappers Cove, and Vsevidof, strong waves drowned sheep. Oil pipelines were damaged at Sand Bay. Many boats were damaged from strong waves.

The tsunami caused twice the damage the tsunami of the 1946 earthquake did. In Hawaii, damage was much more extensive, including two indirect fatalities that occurred when a pilot and photographer were killed while attempting to document the tsunami's arrival from an airplane. About 50 homes were flooded on the north shore of Oahu and significant effects were seen in Waialua Bay. Buildings and bridges were also flooded in Haleiwa. In Hilo, the tsunami damaged buildings. The total damage cost was over $5 million ($46 million in 2017).

See also
List of earthquakes in 1957
List of earthquakes in Alaska
List of earthquakes in the United States
Mount Vsevidof

Notes

References

Sources

External links
 USGS Earthquake Hazards Program – Andreanof Islands, Alaska, Magnitude 8.6
 Tsunami! – 1957 Aleutian tsunami
 The March 9, 1957 Aleutian Tsunami – George Pararas-Carayannis
 

1957 earthquakes
1957 in Alaska
1957
1957
Andreanof
March 1957 events in the United States
March 1957 events in Oceania